James Fairlie (c.1588 – 1658) was a Scottish minister of the Church of Scotland. He was minister of the famous Greyfriars Kirk in Edinburgh and briefly served as both Professor of Divinity at Edinburgh University (1629/30) and as Bishop of Argyll (1637/8)

Life
He was born in Edinburgh around 1588 the son of an "honest burgess". He studied at Edinburgh University gaining an MA in 1607 aged 19. He then served as a "regent" of the university.

In 1625 he was appointed minister of South Leith Parish Church in the harbour area of Edinburgh. In 1629 he was appointed Professor of Divinity at Edinburgh University in 1629. In November 1630 he replaced John Duncanson as "second charge" to Old Greyfriars alongside Rev Andrew Ramsay in "first charge".

He resigned in July 1637, having been elected Bishop of Argyll in place of Bishop Boyd but was deposed from this position by the General Assembly of the Church of Scotland in 1638. After a troubled period trying to find a new charge (including failing to become minister of Largo, in March 1644 he eventually received a post as minister of Lasswade near Edinburgh under patronage of the King.

In April 1652 he was shortlisted along with Prof Alexander Colvill of St Andrews, Prof Thomas Crauford, William Colvill, William Strachan of Aberdeen and William Rait of Brechin for the position of Principal of Edinburgh University to replace John Adamson. William Colvill was chosen but was unavailable and the post was filled for ten years by Robert Leighton until Colvill eventually took on the role.

He died in Lasswade in February 1658 and is buried in the local churchyard.

Publications
The Muse's Welcome (1618)

References
 

1588 births
1658 deaths
Clergy from Edinburgh
Alumni of the University of Edinburgh
Academics of the University of Edinburgh
Scottish bishops
Scottish bishops 1560–1638
17th-century Ministers of the Church of Scotland